Plaza Italia may refer to:

 Plaza Italia, Buenos Aires, a small park in Buenos Aires, Argentina
 Plaza Baquedano aka Plaza Italia, a major landmark in Santiago, Chile
 Plaza Italia, Asunción, a square in Asunción, Paraguay
 Plaza Italia, Caracas, a square in Caracas, Venezuela
 Plaza Italia, Lima, a square in Lima, Peru